"When He's Gone" is the first and only American single from the 1991 Bee Gees album High Civilization. Warner Bros. did nothing to promote the album or the single and neither charted in America, the first and only time a Bee Gees album failed to chart in America (It briefly appeared on the Cashbox singles chart rising to #86). The Bee Gees made two TV appearances in May, 1991 to promote the single. They appeared on Rick Dees' show Into the Night where they sang "When He's Gone" and "One" and on The Arsenio Hall Show they sang "When He's Gone" and "To Love Somebody".

Two different B-sides were issued. In the United States, the song "True Confessions" was used, which was a song that was not included on the cassette versions of High Civilization. The B-sides in the UK were live performances of "Massachusetts" and "You Win Again" done in Melbourne, Australia from their 1989 One For All Tour.

Track listing
7-inch and CD single (Europe)
"When He's Gone" (Single edit) - 4:06
"Massachusetts" (live) - 3:16

7-inch and CD single (UK)
"When He's Gone" (Single edit) - 4:06
"Massachusetts" (live) - 3:16
"You Win Again" (live) - 3:25

7-inch and CD single (US)
"When He's Gone" (Single edit) - 4:06
"True Confessions" - 5:17

Personnel
Bee Gees
Robin Gibb – lead and backing vocals
Barry Gibb – harmony and backing vocals, rhythm guitar
Maurice Gibb – backing vocals, keyboards, synthesizer, rhythm guitar

Additional personnel
Alan Kendall – guitar
Tim Cansfield - guitar
Tim Moore – keyboards, synthesizer, programmer
George "Chocolate" Perry – bass guitar
Lenny Castro – percussion
Julia and Maxine Waters – backing vocals

References

Bee Gees songs
1991 songs
1991 singles
Songs written by Barry Gibb
Songs written by Maurice Gibb
Songs written by Robin Gibb
Warner Records singles